Thekla's lark (Galerida theklae), also known as the Thekla lark, is a species of lark that breeds on the Iberian Peninsula, in northern Africa, and sub-Saharan Africa from Senegal to Somalia. It is a sedentary (non-migratory) species. This is a common bird of dry open country, often at some altitude. Thekla's lark was named by Alfred Edmund Brehm in 1857 for his recently deceased sister Thekla Brehm (1833–1857). The name is a modern Greek one, Θέκλα (Thekla), which comes from ancient Greek Θεόκλεια (Theokleia) derived from θεός (theos, "god") and κλέος (kleos, "glory" or "honour"). The population is declining in Spain, but this is a common bird with a very wide range and the International Union for Conservation of Nature has rated its conservation status as being of "least concern".

Taxonomy and systematics
Thekla's lark has several East African subspecies that show deep genetic divergence both among themselves and from the Mediterranean populations and are consequently strong candidates for consideration as separate species. Formerly, some authorities considered Thekla's lark and the Malabar lark to be conspecific. Alternate names for Thekla's lark include short-crested lark and Thekla crested-lark.

Subspecies 
Twelve subspecies are recognized: 
 G. t. theklae - Brehm, AE, 1857: Also known as Iberian Thekla's lark. Found in Portugal, Spain, Balearic Islands and extreme southern France
 North Moroccan Thekla's lark (G. t. erlangeri) - Hartert, 1904: Found in northern Morocco
 Central Moroccan Thekla's lark (G. t. ruficolor) - Whitaker, 1898: Found in central and north-eastern Morocco, northern Algeria and northern Tunisia
 G. t. theresae - Meinertzhagen, R, 1939: Found in south-western Morocco and Mauritania
 Hauts Plateaux Thekla's lark (G. t. superflua) - Hartert, 1897: Found in eastern Morocco, northern Algeria and eastern Tunisia
 North African Thekla's lark (G. t. carolinae) - Erlanger, 1897: Found in eastern Morocco through the northern Sahara to north-western Egypt
 G. t. harrarensis - Érard & Jarry, 1973: Found in eastern Ethiopia
 G. t. huei - Érard & Naurois, 1973: Found in south-central Ethiopia
 Abyssinian Thekla's lark (G. t. praetermissa) - (Blanford, 1869): Found in southern Eritrea to central Ethiopia
 Somali Thekla's lark (G. t. ellioti) - Hartert, 1897: Originally described as a separate species. Found in northern and central Somalia
 G. t. mallablensis - Colston, 1982: Found in southern Somalia
 G. t. huriensis - Benson, 1947: Found in southern Ethiopia and northern Kenya

Description
This is a smallish lark, slightly smaller than the Eurasian skylark. It has a long, spiky, erectile crest. It is greyer than the Eurasian skylark, and lacks the white wing and tail edge of that species. It is very similar to the widespread crested lark. It is smaller and somewhat greyer than that species, and has a shorter bill. In flight, it shows grey underwings, whereas the crested lark has reddish underwings. The body is mainly dark-streaked grey above and whitish below. The sexes are similar.

Distribution and habitat
Thekla's lark is native and resident in France, Spain, Portugal, Algeria, Egypt, Eritrea, Ethiopia, Kenya, Libya, Morocco, Somalia, Tunisia and Western Sahara. Its typical habitat is rugged areas with scrub, bare patches of ground and semi-arid grassland.

Behaviour and ecology

It nests on the ground, laying two to six eggs. Its food is weed, seeds and insects, the latter especially in the breeding season.

The song is melodious and varied, with mournful whistles and mimicry included. It is softer and more tuneful than that of the crested lark, and may be sung during flight or from the ground or an exposed perch.

References

External links

 Videos, photos and sounds – Internet Bird Collection
Ageing and sexing (PDF; 2.3 MB) by Javier Blasco-Zumeta & Gerd-Michael Heinze
 Distinguishing characters between Thekla lark and crested lark (PDF; 1.7 MB)

Thekla lark
Birds of North Africa
Birds of East Africa
Thekla lark
Thekla lark